"Hypnotize the Moon" is a song written by Steve Dorff and Eric Kaz, and recorded by American country music singer Clay Walker.  It was released in January 1996 as the second single and title track from Walker's CD Hypnotize the Moon.  It peaked at #2 on the Billboard Hot Country Singles & Tracks (now Hot Country Songs) chart, behind "No News" by Lonestar.

Critical reception
Larry Flick of Billboard gave the song a positive review: "The pretty melody and sentimental lyrics should prove popular with country radio listeners."

Music video
The music video was directed by Bill Young. It starts out in a house museum with a boy who is on a tour, and before going along with the tour, he takes a look at a picture of a woman. Then he starts to imagine her at a party in a past themed time, with Walker singing in a background with a bright moon right behind him.

Chart positions
"Hypnotize the Moon" debuted at number 55 on the U.S. Billboard Hot Country Singles & Tracks for the week of January 13, 1996.

Charts

Year-end charts

References

1996 singles
1995 songs
Clay Walker songs
Songs written by Steve Dorff
Songs written by Eric Kaz
Song recordings produced by James Stroud
Giant Records (Warner) singles